The 2019–20 Samford Bulldogs men's basketball team represented Samford University in the 2019–20 NCAA Division I men's basketball season. The Bulldogs, led by sixth-year head coach Scott Padgett, played their home games at the Pete Hanna Center in Homewood, Alabama as members of the Southern Conference. They finished the season 10–23, 4–14 in SoCon play to finish in eighth place. They lost in the first round of the SoCon tournament to VMI.

On March 16, 2020, the school announced that head coach Scott Padgett had been fired. On April 6, the school announced it had hired high school coach Bucky McMillan as the Bulldogs' new head coach.

Previous season
The Bulldogs finished the 2018–19 season 17–16 overall, 6–12 in SoCon play to finish in a tie for 6th place. In the SoCon tournament, they defeated The Citadel in the first round, before losing to UNC Greensboro in the quarterfinals.

Roster

Schedule and results

|-
!colspan=12 style=| Non-conference regular season

|-
!colspan=9 style=| SoCon regular season

|-
!colspan=12 style=| SoCon tournament
|-

|-

Source

References

Samford Bulldogs men's basketball seasons
Samford Bulldogs
Samford Bulldogs men's basketball
Samford Bulldogs men's basketball